The Wicklow Round is a long-distance hill running challenge in the Wicklow Mountains in Ireland. Rounds completed outside of a cut-off time of 24-hours are not generally recorded. Irish ultra-runner Joe Lalor is credited with the creation of the Round.

The first person to complete the Round was Moire O’Sullivan, in a time of 22:58:30 on 29 May 2008; O'Sullivan went on to write a book about her experience on the Round called Mud, Sweat, and Tears. Eoin Keith set a new record of 17:53:45 on 30 May 2009, which stood for nine years until it was beaten by U.S. runner, and Appalachian Trail record holder, Joe McConaughy, in a time of 17:09:44 on 6 May 2018. Several other runners have set records for the fastest Round. Between April and May 2019, the men's record was broken across three consecutive attempts, by Paddy O'Leary, Shane Lynch and Gavin Byrne. These attempts were featured in the short documentary film, "Coming Home - Ag Teacht Abhaile".

, the record is 15:04:30, set by Irish IAU Trail World Championships contestant, Gavin Byrne on 18 May 2019.

Route 

The 26 mountains of the Wicklow Round must be completed in the order as outlined below, as well as the check-point in the forest of Drumgoff.

Completions 

The Irish Mountain Running Association (IMRA) record the following sub-24 hour completions of the Wicklow Round:

Books & Films

 
 Dooster Film (July 2019). Coming Home - Ag Teacht Abhaile. Award-winning documentary film.

See also
Denis Rankin Round
Lists of mountains in Ireland
Wicklow Mountains
Wicklow Way

References

External links 
 Official Site: Irish Mountain Running Association: The IMRA Wicklow Round
 Account of the first-ever successful official Round on the old route, 2007 (Tony Kiernan and Gary Moralee): The Wicklow Round
 Account of the first-ever successful official Round on the current route, 2009 (Moire O'Sullivan):  Running over Mountains and around the World: Wicklow Round Route
 Book about the first-ever successful official Round on the current route, 2009 (Moire O'Sullivan): Mud, Sweat, and Tears - an Irish Woman’s Journey of Self-Discovery
 Account of successful official Round on the current route, 2012 (Finbar McGurren): Get No Sleep Adventure Racing: Wicklow Round 2012 – Report
 Video of successful official Round on the current route, 2013 (Richard Nunan, Zoran Skrba and Jeff Fitzsimons): Vimeo: Wicklow Round 2013
 Account of successful official Round on the current route, 2013 (Gareth Little): summit2summit: Wicklow Round Success – Summer 2013
 Video of unsuccessful official Round on the current route, 2014: YouTube: Wicklow Round June 2014: Director's Cut
 Account of successful unofficial Round on the current route, 2016: Carnethy Hill Running Club: Wicklow Round
 Documentary film about Paddy O'Leary's Round on the current route, 2019: Coming Home - Ag Teacht Abhaile

Fell running challenges
Challenge walks
Peak bagging in Ireland
Mountains and hills of Ireland
Mountains and hills of the Republic of Ireland
Mountains and hills of County Wicklow